As of 2022, Guangdong have 160 institutions of higher education, ranking first in South Central China region and 2nd among all Chinese provinces/municipalities after Jiangsu (168). Guangdong is also the seat of 14 adult higher education institutions. Many universities and colleges are located in major cities like Shenzhen and Guangzhou. Guangzhou, the capital of Guangdong, hosts 83 institutions of higher education (excluding adult colleges), ranking 1st in South China region and 2nd (tie) nationwide after Beijing.  There are 8 national key universities under Double First Class University Plan in Guangdong, the highest in South Central China region and the fourth-highest after Beijing, Jiangsu and Shanghai.

The following is List of Universities and Colleges in Guangdong.

Three-year colleges 

 Guangdong Institute of Arts and Sciences
 Guangdong Nanhua Vocational College of Industry and Commerce
 Shenzhen Institute of Information Technology
 Shenzhen Polytechnic

References

List of Chinese Higher Education Institutions — Ministry of Education
List of Chinese universities, including official links
Guangdong Institutions Admitting International Students

 
Guandong